The TVyNovelas Awards was a Colombian award given annually to national and international actors and productions. The ceremony is broadcast annually by the television channel RCN Televisión, the prize goes in general to telenovelas and Colombian series, also Caracol Televisión productions and other TV channels are nominated. The first awards ceremony was in 1992. The awards are a Colombian version of TVyNovelas Awards Mexico.

The awards were discontinued as of 2019 due to closure of Editorial Televisa in Colombia, and the end of the TVyNovelas magazine.

Awards ceremonies 
 26th TVyNovelas Awards Colombia (2017)

Ratings

References 

Colombian awards
Awards established in 1991
1991 establishments in Colombia
Awards disestablished in 2018
2018 disestablishments in Colombia
Live television shows